is a fictional character in the Doraemon anime and manga series created by Fujiko Fujio, the pen name of writing team Hiroshi Fujimoto and Motoo Abiko. He is also the main character in The Doraemons (special version). Known as Sidney, Specky, Nobi Nobi and Noby, in some of the English localizations of the anime, Nobita is usually depicted as an academically  elementary school student in Tokyo's Nerima Ward and the only child of Nobisuke and Tamako Nobi, who is perpetually looked after by the series' title character, a robotic cat from the future sent back in time by Nobita's descendant.

Along with Doraemon, Nobita is considered to be one of the most popular and widely recognizable manga characters due to the series' popularity, which extends beyond its native Japan.

Characteristics
Nobita's characterization depicts him as a lazy and flawed person, including but not limited to a lack of physical co-ordination or athletic talent, predisposition to laziness, reluctance to engage in critical thinking, and sometimes exhibits childish or even perverted behavior. He dislikes books and lacks a basic grasp of knowledge, such as being unable to understand concepts such as the definition of an eclipse. He often takes any chance to take a nap and is often known as 'The Lazy King'. In a typical episode, Nobita begs Doraemon to lend him a gadget to get revenge on his bully classmates, Gian and Suneo, show off to his classmate and future love interest, Shizuka Minamoto, or to provide convenience for himself such as getting his homework done quicker. Whenever he possesses Doraemon's gadgets, he almost always abuses the gadget's power to the point that the effect backfires on him. He envies his classmate Hidetoshi Dekisugi, a straight-A student admired by all of the girls in his class, including Shizuka. Nobita's typical day consists of arriving late to school, falling asleep during class, scoring low marks on his tests, getting scolded by his teacher and teased by Gian and Suneo, falling in the curbside rain gutters, getting chased by dogs, getting scolded by his mother for not completing his tasks, and being bullied by people he knows, except Shizuka.

Even though Nobita possesses many questionable character traits, he occasionally displays redeeming qualities such as kind-heartedness, courage, and even a good work ethic. In some full-length stories he has risked his life to help save others, or even entire civilizations. In some episodes, it is implied that his poor academic grades is due to his lazy nature as opposed to a lack of intellectual ability. Nobita is known for his sharp gunfiring abilities and also skilful in the game of Cat's cradle as shown in many  episodes. The character has also demonstrated creativity when it comes to utilizing Doraemon's gadgets in novel ways. For example, in one instance he finds a way to profitably use a gadget called the "broadcasting mirror" for advertising, even when Doraemon himself couldn't think of any use for it. Other examples include his ability to co-opt free flying with the use of Doraemon's "power of wind" fans, which can create a gust of wind with just a gentle swish, and his use of the voice hardener, which is considered useless by Doraemon, for transportation. Nobita's creativity is the proof enough of his high intelligence. Also he has extensive knowledge about science, environment and Doraemon's gadgets.

Despite not doing well academically, occasionally, Nobita is able to easily score a good mark or do well on a test. His imagination is the reason why he can write a great narrative, even with so many spelling and grammatical mistakes. Although not good at drawing, he still managed to write a 32 paged comic.

Appearances
The central premise of the Doraemon media franchise is grounded on the relationship between its protagonists, Doraemon and Nobita.

Nobita encounters Doraemon after the robot is sent back in time by one of his descendants, a young boy named Sewashi Nobi to improve the circumstances of his great great grandfather so that his descendants may enjoy a better future. In the original timeline, Nobita experienced nothing but misery and misfortune manifested in the form of very poor grades and bullying throughout his life. A running gag in the series involve Nobita crying for and begging Doraemon to use his gadgets to solve a problem, often at the beginning of an episode or scenario.
 Throughout the series Nobita is mostly shown to be overly dependent on Doraemon; He begs Doraemon for many things, such as gadgets allowing him to have vengeance on Gian for hurting him or taking his belongings, or to have something better to show-off after listening to Suneo brag about his vacations, expensive games and toys, and other privileges that he enjoys.

In other media
Japanese actor Satoshi Tsumabuki appeared as Nobita in several live-action television commercials throughout 2011 and 2016. The advertisement's were created by Toyota and depict the series' characters two decades after they "grow up."

Nobita has appeared in various educational manga along with other Doraemon characters. The character has been used in a public service campaign organized by the West Japan Railway Company (JR West), where posters of Doraemon, Nobita and several supporting characters from the series were distributed to promote appropriate etiquette for train travel during the ongoing COVID-19 pandemic.

Cultural impact
Due to the success of the Doraemon franchise, Nobita is an internationally recognized character that has attained considerable notoriety. The character's likeness has been recreated as figurines sold during festive celebrations in parts of India. Nobita's family residence, a typical Japanese suburban house, is a recognizable element of the series to international audiences.

Nobita's relationship with Shizuka has been referenced by an Indian television personality from the Bigg Boss reality television series in a public discussion about the rivalry between his cast mates Sidharth Shukla and Rashami Desai, whereas his relationship dynamic with Doraemon had been co-opted as a satirical form of criticism against a Malaysian politician.

A footprint fossil of a dinosaur species discovered in China in 2020 is named Eubrontes nobitai after Nobita.

Reception

Critics found that the character's flawed personality and modest background is considered to be a departure from other contemporary anime and manga protagonists typically portrayed as special or extraordinary, and the consistent portrayal of Nobita as being relatable and down-to-earth had been cited as reasons behind the character's appeal as well as the contrary. According to the Italian Parents Movement (Moige), in the manga, "the lazy Nobita does not know any kind of appreciable evolution", though there are still good points including "the criticism of bullying, the goodness that transpires from the little Nobita and the positive figure of Shizuka". According to an analysis by Anne Allison, professor of cultural anthropology at Duke University, the strong point of the series and its heart is the relationship between Nobita and Doraemon, as opposed to the variety of the gadgets showcased by the latter.

In early 2021, the character became a trending topic on social media following the international release of promotional material featuring the character marrying Shizuka in the 3D computer animated film Stand by Me Doraemon 2.

Controversies
Nobita's physical appearance was referenced as a term of insult by Spanish YouTube personality AuronPlay against Spanish entrepreneur Josep Maria Bartomeu for his alleged resemblance to the character. Bartomeu responded to AuronPlay's comment by filing a police complaint against him, and threatened to take further legal action.

In August 2016, a member of the Tehreek-i-Insaf party submitted a resolution in the Punjab Assembly calling for a ban on the series, alleging the show's "negative impact" on Pakistani children: one of the cited reasons behind the motion was the depiction of Nobita's interactions with Shizuka at school, which was labelled as incompatible with Pakistani and Muslim culture. Similarly, politicians and activists in neighbouring India have criticized Nobita's problematic behavioural traits for setting a bad example to children, such as answering back to their parents and refusing to do their homework.
One activist blamed the character's supposed influence for a 2013 exam-fixing scandal in the state of Madhya Pradesh.

References

Further reading

Child characters in anime and manga
Child characters in television
Child characters in animated films
Comics characters introduced in 1969
Doraemon characters
Male characters in anime and manga
Time travelers
Fictional Japanese people in anime and manga